Sandra Yaxley, OAM is a cerebral palsy Australian Paralympic swimmer.  At the 1988 Seoul Games, she won a gold medal in the Women's 100 m Freestyle C6 and a silver medal in the Women's 50 m Backstroke C6.  At the 1992 Barcelona Games, she won a gold medal in the Women's 4x50 m Freestyle S1–6 event and a bronze medal in the Women's 100 m Freestyle S6 event. She retired from swimming after the 1992 Paralympics but took up coaching disabled and able-bodied swimmers. She was coached by Wayne De Lacy.

Yaxley was originally from Tasmania and moved to Perth, Western Australia at an early age. She began swimming when she was four as a form of rehabilitation.  She attended Swanbourne Senior High School. In 2000, she was awarded the Australian Sports Medal and in 2013 inducted into Swimming Western Australia Hall of Fame at the age of 44.

Yaxley's motto is "Let me try and, if I can't do it, I'll know, but if I can do it, then watch out world."

References

Female Paralympic swimmers of Australia
Swimmers at the 1988 Summer Paralympics
Swimmers at the 1992 Summer Paralympics
Paralympic gold medalists for Australia
Paralympic silver medalists for Australia
Paralympic bronze medalists for Australia
Recipients of the Medal of the Order of Australia
Recipients of the Australian Sports Medal
Living people
Medalists at the 1988 Summer Paralympics
Medalists at the 1992 Summer Paralympics
Cerebral Palsy category Paralympic competitors
Swimmers with cerebral palsy
Sportswomen from Western Australia
Swimmers from Perth, Western Australia
1968 births
Paralympic medalists in swimming
Australian female freestyle swimmers
Australian female backstroke swimmers
S6-classified Paralympic swimmers